The Dean of Toronto is an Anglican dean in the Diocese of Toronto of the  Ecclesiastical Province of Ontario, based at the Cathedral Church of St. James in downtown Toronto, Ontario. The incumbent is also Rector of St. James Cathedral.

The incumbents have been:

References

Anglican Church of Canada deans
Deans of Toronto
Deans of Toronto